Benjamin John Bowen (birth registered second ¼ 1915 – 26 February 2009) was a Welsh rugby union, and professional rugby league footballer who played in the 1930s and 1940s. He played club level rugby union (RU) for Llanelli, and representative rugby league for Wales, and at club level for Wigan (Heritage No. 417), and Leigh (where he scored seven tries), (Heritage No. 576), and represented the Welsh league team.

Background
Bowen was born Llanelli, Wales, he was the first ever landlord of The Wellfield Hotel public house in the middle of the then new Beech Hill housing estate in Wigan, and he died aged 93 in Wigan, Greater Manchester, England.

Rugby career
Bowen first played first-class rugby for Llanelli, and was on the brink of winning his first cap for the Welsh union team when he switched to league. Bowen was a trialist in 1938 and managed to play in front of the selectors on the side of the 'Probables', but on leaving the field he was approached by officials from Wigan. The club offered him a ten-year contract, and when Bowen accepted he severed his links from the union code by becoming professional. Bowen changed rugby football codes from rugby union to rugby league when he transferred to Wigan, but with the outbreak of World War II he joined the British Armed Forces becoming a member of the Welsh Guards. Jackie Bowen played  in Wigan's 10–7 victory over Salford in the 1938–39 Lancashire County Cup Final during the 1938–39 season at Station Road, Swinton on Saturday 22 October 1938. After the war he returned to Wigan, and in 1945 he won his first international cap in a game against England.

Jackie Bowen played  in Wigan's 13–9 victory over Dewsbury in the Championship Final first-leg during the 1943–44 season at Central Park, Wigan on Saturday 13 May 1944, and played  in the 12–5 victory over Dewsbury in the Championship Final second-leg during the 1943–44 season at Crown Flatt, Dewsbury on Saturday 20 May 1944.

Although capped for Wales, he did not receive his actual cap until 2005 when he was awarded it during a half-time presentation on the pitch of the JJB Stadium in a match between Wigan and St. Helens.

Genealogical information
Bowen settled in Wigan, becoming a publican in the city, and marrying local girl Phyllis Brown, they had children; Benjamin J. Keith Bowenduring fourth quarter  in Ince district), and Margaret A. Bowen during third quarter  in Ince district).

References

External links
Rugby League Wartime Matches: Odsal Stadium, Bradford (1940s) Film No: 679
Statistics at wigan.rlfans.com

1915 births
2009 deaths
British Army personnel of World War II
Footballers who switched code
Leigh Leopards players
Llanelli RFC players
Publicans
Rugby league players from Llanelli
Rugby union players from Llanelli
Wales national rugby league team players
Welsh Guards soldiers
Welsh rugby league players
Welsh rugby union players
Wigan Warriors players